Free ride, freeride, or freeriding may refer to:

Sports
 Freerider (climb), a climbing route in Yosemite and featured in the 2018 film Free Solo
 Freeriding (sport), skiing or snowboarding in natural, un-groomed terrain
 Free Riding, extreme horseback riding

Media

Film and television
 Free Ride (TV series), a Fox TV sitcom
 Free Ride (1986 film), a 1986 film
 Free Ride (2013 film)
 A Free Ride, a 1915 American pornographic film and the earliest surviving American pornographic film

Music
 Free Ride (album), a 1977 album by Dizzy Gillespie
 Free Ride, a 1978 album by Marshall Hain
 Free Ride, a 2004 album by Carson Cole

Songs
 "Free Ride" (song), a 1973 song by Dan Hartman for the Edgar Winter Group
 "Free Ride", a song by Nick Drake on the album Pink Moon
 "Free Ride", a song by Annabelle Chvostek on the album Bija
 "Free Ride", a song by the Concretes on the album Nationalgeographic
 "Free Ride", a song by Audio Adrenaline on the album Bloom
 "Free Ride", a song by Mock Orange on the album First EP
 "Free Ride", a song by Watashi Wa on the album Eager Seas
 "Free Ride", a song by Black Label Society on the album Hangover Music Vol. VI
 "Free Ride", a song by Embrace on the album All You Good Good People

Economics
 Fare evasion
 Free riding (stock market), buying stocks without the money to cover the purchase
 Free-rider problem, the problem faced by non-excludable goods providers

Other uses
 FreeRIDE, a Ruby integrated development environment in Watir

See also
 Free rider (disambiguation)
 Freeride (disambiguation)